NHIS may refer to:

National Health Insurance Scheme (Ghana)
National Health Insurance Scheme (Nigeria)
National Health Interview Survey, annual survey by the National Center for Health Statistics in the United States
National Homelessness Information System, a system to collect and analyze data on the use of homeless shelters in Canada
New Hampshire International Speedway, former name of the New Hampshire Motor Speedway in the United States

See also 
 National Health Insurance Scheme (disambiguation)